Birak-e Olya (also Romanized as Bīrak-e ‘Olyā; also known as Bīraq-e ‘Olyā, Bīraq-e Bālā and Bīrak-e Bālā) is a village in Sangar Rural District, in the Central District of Faruj County, North Khorasan Province, Iran. At the 2006 census, its population was 367, in 96 families.

References 

Populated places in Faruj County